William Herbert Paschall (born April 22, 1954) is a former Major League Baseball pitcher. Paschall pitched in 11 games over three seasons for the Kansas City Royals between 1978 and 1981, all as a relief pitcher. On the final day of the 1978 regular season (October 1, 1978), Paschall recorded his only MLB save in a 1-0 Royals victory over the Twins. 

Paschal was a two-sport standout at the University of North Carolina. He was a starting quarterback in football, leading the Tar Heels in passing in 1973 and 1975, and was an All-Atlantic Coast Conference selection as a starting pitcher in baseball. While playing for the Tar Heels from 1973 to 1976 he compiled a career 1.95 earned run average, which ranks fourth on the all-time list. He is tied for second on the UNC all-time list in complete games with 19, including 8 in 1976. 

Paschall is an accomplished amateur golfer and set the competitive senior course record at Greensboro National Golf Club in 2016 with a 10-under-par 62.

References

External links
, or Retrosheet, or Venezuelan Professional Baseball League

1954 births
Living people
American football quarterbacks
Baseball players from Norfolk, Virginia
Jacksonville Suns players
Kansas City Royals players
Major League Baseball pitchers
North Carolina Tar Heels baseball players
North Carolina Tar Heels football players
Omaha Royals players
Players of American football from Norfolk, Virginia
Tiburones de La Guaira players
American expatriate baseball players in Venezuela
University of North Carolina at Chapel Hill alumni